Twenty Two Tunes Live From Tokyo is a live album punk band Toy Dolls recorded during a concert in Tokyo in 1990.

Track listing

Personnel
Michael "Olga" Algar– vocals, guitar
John "K'Cee" Casey– bass, vocals
Martin "Marty" Yule– drums, vocals

References

External links
Album page on the Toy Dolls website

1990 live albums
Toy Dolls albums